Spurius is a genus of passalid beetles.

The name Spurius was a Roman praenomen (see Spurius (praenomen)) and may also refer to figures from ancient history and/or mythology:

Spurius Maelius
Spurius Tarpeius
Spurius Antius
Spurius Carvilius Ruga
Spurius Cassius Vecellinus